is a passenger railway station located in the town of Ranzan, Saitama, Japan, operated by the private railway operator Tōbu Railway.

Lines
All services, (TJ Liner, Rapid express, Rapid, Express, Semi express, Local) stop at this station. During the daytime, the station is served by two Rapid trains and one Express train per hour in each direction to and from Ikebukuro.

Station layout

The station consists of an island platform serving two tracks, connected to the station building by a footbridge. An additional side platform remains on the west side of the down track, but this is no longer used.

Platforms

Adjacent stations

History

From 17 March 2012, station numbering was introduced on the Tōbu Tōjō Line, with Musashi-Ranzan Station becoming "TJ-32".

Passenger statistics
In fiscal 2019, the station was used by an average of 7287 passengers daily.

Surrounding area
Ranzan Town Hall
Sugaya Yakata, National Historic Site

See also
 List of railway stations in Japan

References

External links

Tobu station information 

Tobu Tojo Main Line
Stations of Tobu Railway
Railway stations in Saitama Prefecture
Railway stations in Japan opened in 1923
Ranzan, Saitama